Viyan may refer to:
 Viyən, Azerbaijan
 Vian, Iran